Pope Adrian 37th Psychristiatric is a concept album by the band Rudimentary Peni. It was recorded in 1992 and released in 1995. The majority of the album was written while lead singer/guitarist Nick Blinko was being detained in a psychiatric hospital under Section 3 of the 1983 Mental Health Act. The subject matter of the album relates to the delusions Blinko was experiencing at the time, particularly the idea that he was "Pope Adrian 37th" — a reference to Pope Adrian IV.

Adding to the album's unique sound, the pseudo-latinized phrase "Papas Adrianus" (Pope Adrian) is looped and can be heard in the background through the entire album.

Blinko provided the artwork for the album.

Track listing
 "Pogo Pope"
 "The Pope with No Name"
 "Hadrianich Relique"
 "Il Papus Puss"
 "Muse Sick (Sic)"
 "Vatican't City Hearse"
 "I'm a Dream"
 "We're Gonna Destroy Life the World Gets Higher and Higher"
 "Pills, Popes And Potions"
 "Ireland Sun"
 "Regicide Chaz III"
 "Iron Lung"

References

Concept albums
1995 albums
Rudimentary Peni albums